The 1902–03 Minnesota Golden Gophers men's basketball team represented the University of Minnesota in intercollegiate basketball during the 1902–03 season. The team finished the season with a 13–0 record and was retroactively named the national champion by the Premo-Porretta Power Poll.

References

Minnesota Golden Gophers men's basketball seasons
Minnesota
NCAA Division I men's basketball tournament championship seasons
Minnesota Golden Gophers Men's Basketball Team
Minnesota Golden Gophers Men's Basketball Team